Tenko may refer to:

Tenko (fox)
Tenko (TV series), a joint BBC/Australian Broadcasting Corporation (ABC) television drama
Tenkō, the ideological reversal of Japanese socialists between 1925 and 1945

People
Princess Tenko, a Japanese magician, upon whom the cartoon Tenko and the Guardians of the Magic was based
Tenko and the Guardians of the Magic, an animated cartoon created by Saban Entertainment in 1995

Fictional characters
A character from the anime The Law of Ueki
A character from the anime Kamisama Kazoku
Tenko Chabashira, a character from Danganronpa V3: Killing Harmony
Tenko Shimura, a character from My Hero Academia

See also

Tonko